Tamino may refer to:
 Tamino (musician), Belgian-Egyptian singer, musician and model
 Tamino (The Magic Flute), a principal (and flute-blowing) character  in the opera The Magic Flute (Die Zauberflöte) by Wolfgang Amadeus Mozart  
 Tamino Information Server, an XML-based database management product from Software AG

See also 
 Tomino, a commune on the island of Corsica